Stolichno is a Bulgarian bock beer produced by the Zagorka Brewery since 2004.

The beer was originally brewed at Sofia's Ariana Brewery (hence the name, which literally means "of the capital city"). It is a strong beer with an ABV of 6.5%.

References

External links 
 ariana.bg – official website
 Heineken Zagorka Brewery – brewery website
 Stolichno at Bulgarian Beers

Beer in Bulgaria
Bulgarian brands
Heineken brands